Serhiy Dmytrovych Osachuk (born 7 June 1972) is a Ukrainian historian and politician. He served as Governor of Chernivtsi Oblast from 2019 to 2022.

Biography 
In 1994, Osachuk graduated from the University of Chernivtsi. He is a Candidate of Historical Sciences and a senior researcher at the University of Chernivtsi. In 2010, Osachuk ran for the Chernivtsi City Council. Since 2013, he served as an Honorary Consul to Austria.

He speaks German fluently.

Controversies
Osachuk was known for a series of controversial statements and measures, such as the denial of the Fântâna Albă massacre and the removal from the Central Square of Chernivtsi of a banner that reproduced the first documentary attestation of the city, issued by the Moldavian ruler Alexandru cel Bun. Due to this, the Romanian press labeled him as anti-Romanian.

References

External links 
 
 

1972 births
Living people
Anti-Romanian sentiment
Politicians from Chernivtsi
Chernivtsi University alumni
21st-century Ukrainian historians
21st-century translators
Ukrainian translators
Ukrainian nationalists
Honorary consuls
Governors of Chernivtsi Oblast
21st-century Ukrainian politicians
Unity (Ukraine) politicians
Academic staff of Chernivtsi University